Marden is a village and civil parish in the English county of Herefordshire.

Marden village is approximately  due north of the city of Hereford, and is contiguous with the hamlets of Walker's Green and Paradise Green. The parish also includes the hamlet of Burmarsh to the south of the village.

The Marches Way long-distance footpath passes through the village and, heading south, then crosses Sutton Walls Hill Fort.

A company growing, packing, importing and exporting soft fruit and asparagus is based in the village, and employs more than 2,400 people, predominantly Romanians and Bulgarians, to work on its farms in Herefordshire and Kent.

The cattle breeder, Richard de Quincey, lived in Marden from 1922 until his death in 1965.

References

External links

Marden's "Vision of Britain" page
GENUKI(tm) page

Villages in Herefordshire